Jodie Louise Marsh is an English media personality, model and bodybuilder. She has appeared on numerous reality television shows, including Essex Wives (2002), Back to Reality (2004), Love on a Saturday Night (2004), Celebrity Big Brother (2006, 2012), and Big Brother's Bit on the Side (2011–2013). She also featured in her own reality show titled Totally Jodie Marsh (2007).

Marsh began glamour modelling in 2002 on Page 3 of The Sun, for which she appeared six times in total. Her autobiography, Keeping It Real, reached the top 10 on The Sunday Times Bestseller List. She is also known for her fitness regime and natural bodybuilding.

Early life
Jodie Louise Marsh was born in Brentwood, Essex to John Marsh and Kristina Marsh, who owned a scaffolding business. She was educated at the independent Brentwood School. She has one brother. Marsh has spoken extensively about her experiences of being bullied at school, which began when she was 11.

She had rhinoplasty aged 16 after experiencing bullying for her nose, which she broke in a hockey accident. Marsh acquired 11A*-A grade GCSEs at school, followed by three A-Levels.

Television career
Marsh was working as a stripper at Stringfellows gentlemen’s club in London when she appeared in the documentary television series Essex Wives in 2002. This led to a number of modelling jobs. She has subsequently participated in many reality television shows, including Trust Me - I'm A Holiday Rep, Channel 4's The Games and E4's Fool Around... with Jodie Marsh on two occasions.

Marsh won a celebrity version of The Weakest Link in 2006 In mid-2008 she had a cameo role in the first episode of Channel 4's Friday night comedy show The Kevin Bishop Show.

Celebrity Big Brother
In January 2006, Marsh appeared on Celebrity Big Brother 4. Marsh's treatment by other contestants provoked debate about whether Marsh was being bullied. Australian feminist writer and ex-Big Brother contestant Germaine Greer wrote a comment piece for The Guardian accusing the show's production company Endemol, presenter Davina McCall, and Marsh's fellow housemates, particularly George Galloway, of bullying.

On 13 January, she was the first to be voted out of the Big Brother house — with 8 out of 10 possible nominations from her fellow housemates, and 42 percent of the public vote.

Post Celebrity Big Brother TV work 
Marsh appeared on several of the spinoff shows including: Big Brother's Little Brother, Big Brother's Big Mouth and Big Brother's EForum.

In its second UK series, Marsh showed viewers around her home on MTV's Cribs in 2008. Also in 2008, Marsh appeared on Channel 4's documentary It's Me or the Dog. She was given training tips at home to deal with her six dogs – two bulldogs (Paddy and Lyla) and four chihuahuas (Bean, Baby, Teddy, and Tommy).

Marsh appeared as a contestant in Channel Five's reality show The All Star Talent Show, hosted by Myleene Klass and Andi Peters. Following this, Marsh began presenting her own series, Get A Life for Living TV on 1 March 2007. It was cancelled after two episodes.

On 29 September 2010, Marsh appeared in the one-off documentary Jodie Marsh Tattoo Apprentice which was screened on the channel DMAX.

On 25 January 2012, Marsh appeared on Channel 5's Bullied: My Secret Past. She spoke of the effect bullying had on her and how it has made her who she is today. She also met other victims of bullying.

In April 2013, Channel 5 broadcast the first of two shows titled Jodie Marsh: Bullied. The show features Marsh venturing to the United States to investigate how American schools tackle bullying.

In March 2015, TLC broadcast Jodie Marsh On… Women Who Pay For Sex And Drugs, about women who pay for the services of male escorts.

Totally Jodie Marsh 
In May 2007, the website Marry Me Jodie Marsh was launched with the teaser "I'm getting married this September... Only problem is that I don't have a man!" Men were invited to submit an application for a series of open auditions for the chance to marry Marsh that September. MTV filmed the search and subsequent wedding.

The reality series documenting Marsh's search to find a husband, entitled Totally Jodie Marsh: Who'll Take Her Up the Aisle?, premiered in July 2007. Marsh eventually chose Matt Peacock, an ex-boyfriend of fellow glamour model Jordan.

The couple married on 1 September 2007. A second ceremony at her mother’s home was shown on MTV on 2 September 2007. They decided to separate in December 2007. Marsh later admitted to Love It magazine in its 8 January 2008 issue that ".. the marriage was for TV. It was never for real" and "I'm not hiding the fact I did the TV show for money. Of course I did".

Modelling career
Following her appearance on Essex Wives, Marsh modelled for The Sun's Page 3, which she appeared on six times in total.

Marsh worked with – and appeared in – magazines such as FHM, Loaded, Nuts and Zoo Weekly.

In June 2009, Marsh appeared on the cover of Zoo Weekly for the first time; she also appeared in a number of subsequent issues.

Other work

Bodybuilding 
At the end of January 2010, Marsh was featured on LA Muscle TV in an hour long show called 6 pack in 4 weeks. Jodie's work on the show resulted in a photo shoot for Muscle and Fitness magazine. In October 2011, Marsh entered the UK Natural Physique Association Bodybuilding Championships in Sheffield, where she was placed 5th overall.

Marsh appeared on Daybreak and The Late Late Show in October 2011.

Marsh's new physique resulted in photoshoots and interviews with various magazines. OK! magazine featured an "at home" interview on 11 October 2011. Heat magazine followed on 12 October 2011.

In 2012, Marsh featured in two TV shows for the DMAX network. The first, Jodie Marsh: Bodybuilder chronicled Marsh's attempts to compete with only weeks of training. The second show, Jodie Marsh: Brawn in the USA, featured Jodie winning gold in the International Natural Bodybuilding Federation Bodybuilding Championships in Los Angeles in June 2012.

Marsh owns a nutritional food supplements firm called JST Nutrition. In 2021, she was named by the Advertising Standards Authority (ASA), the UK's advertising watchdog, on a list of 122 Instagram influencers who have repeatedly violated ASA regulations.

Writing 
In 2005, Marsh published her autobiography Keeping It Real. The hardback was released in 2005, followed by a paperback version in 2006. The hardback version reached the top 10 on the Amazon best-sellers list.

Marsh was previously Zoo Weekly magazine's "sexpert", advising men on sex-related issues. Her choice as an agony aunt angered some established professionals. She defended herself against these claims, stating, "I haven't exactly got a degree in psychology but I just love sex, don't I?"

Personal life
In December 2006, Marsh announced her engagement to Brentwood DJ David Doyle (II), after dating for 11 days. Eschewing the traditional engagement ring, Marsh instead tattooed Doyle's full name on her hand and the couple appeared together in OK! magazine announcing their plan to marry in a fetish ceremony in a dungeon. The relationship ended between late December and mid-January 2007. Marsh claimed Doyle had been unfaithful.

In 2015, Marsh married personal trainer James Placido. She claimed that she was celibate for 5 years before she met Placido. The couple got divorced after eight months in April 2016.

Controversies
In 2004, Marsh sold a story to the News of the World claiming that she had had a sexual liaison with Chelsea F.C. midfielder Frank Lampard. Lampard denied the claims and filed a complaint with the Press Complaints Commission. The complaint was not upheld.

Filmography

Television

As herself

Film

References

External links

Living people
English female adult models
English female bodybuilders
English television personalities
English autobiographers
Glamour models
People educated at Brentwood School, Essex
Page 3 girls
People from Brentwood, Essex
Women autobiographers
English LGBT sportspeople
LGBT bodybuilders
Year of birth missing (living people)